Robin Previtali (born 5 June 1987, in Besançon) is a French footballer, who currently plays as a striker for Vesoul Haute-Saône.

Career
Previatali joined Sochaux in 2002 as a youth at the age of 15, and played his first match for the first team in Ligue 1 in the 2006-7 season.  Having played in the French Cup in that same season, he received a winner's medal when Sochaux went on to win the cup.

References

French footballers
French expatriate footballers
1987 births
FC Sochaux-Montbéliard players
AS Beauvais Oise players
Associação Naval 1º de Maio players
US Créteil-Lusitanos players
Championnat National players
Ligue 1 players
Primeira Liga players
Expatriate footballers in Portugal
French people of Italian descent
Living people
Sportspeople from Besançon
FC Vesoul players
Association football forwards
Footballers from Bourgogne-Franche-Comté
French expatriate sportspeople in Portugal